Levering Mission (also known as Wetumka Boarding School; Creek National Boarding School) is a historic mission school and hospital founded by the Creek Nation in what is now Wetumka, Oklahoma.

It was built in 1880 with the partnership of the Creek Nation and Southern Baptist Convention. This historic building was added to the National Register of Historic Places listings in Hughes County, Oklahoma in 1974.

References

External links
Site information

Schools in Oklahoma
Hospitals in Oklahoma
Baptist churches in Oklahoma
School buildings completed in 1880
Hospital buildings completed in 1880
Buildings and structures in Hughes County, Oklahoma
National Register of Historic Places in Hughes County, Oklahoma
School buildings on the National Register of Historic Places in Ohio